The 2017 Alabama 500 was a Monster Energy NASCAR Cup Series race held on October 15, 2017, at Talladega Superspeedway in Lincoln, Alabama. Contested over 188 laps on the 2.66 mile (4.2 km) superspeedway, it was the 31st race of the 2017 Monster Energy NASCAR Cup Series season, the fifth race of the Playoffs, and second race of the Round of 12. Brad Keselowski won the first stage and the race, while Ryan Newman finished second and Trevor Bayne finished third. Ryan Blaney won the second stage.

Report

Background

Talladega Superspeedway, originally known as Alabama International Motor Superspeedway (AIMS), is a motorsports complex located north of Talladega, Alabama. It is located on the former Anniston Air Force Base in the small city of Lincoln. The track is a tri-oval and was constructed in the 1960s by the International Speedway Corporation, a business controlled by the France Family. Talladega is most known for its steep banking and the unique location of the start/finish line that's located just past the exit to pit road. The track currently hosts the NASCAR series such as the Sprint Cup Series, Xfinity Series and the Camping World Truck Series. Talladega is the longest NASCAR oval with a length of  tri-oval like the Daytona International Speedway, which also is a  tri-oval.

Entry list

Practice

First practice
During practice, Jimmie Johnson spun in turn 4 after cutting down a left-rear tire from debris.

Final practice

Qualifying

Qualifying results

Race

Stage 1

Start 
Dale Earnhardt Jr. led the field to the green flag at 2:19 p.m., Joey Logano took the lead on lap 1 and led 19 laps, The first caution of the race flew on lap 27 for a multi-car wreck in the frontstretch, as several drivers tried to drop onto pit road for stops. Jamie McMurray, a playoff driver, was in the heart of the accident as he tried to pit from the track’s second lane. McMurray spun and sailed up the track, where he was hit hard by Jeffrey Earnhardt, Others involved in the wreck were Mark Thompson, Kyle Busch, Chris Buescher and Erik Jones. Busch, whose car received minor damage, blamed the crash on Jamie McMurray, who admitted he made a mistake.

The race restarted on lap 37 and it remained green for 15 laps, Paul Menard whacked the outside wall to bring out the day’s second caution on lap 52, starting a round of pit stops. During the stops, Earnhardt was penalized for speeding on pit road. Menard’s accident occurred near the end of the first stage. 

The race restarted on lap 55, and Brad Keselowski finished first, followed by Joey Logano, Ryan Blaney, Ricky Stenhouse Jr. and Jimmie Johnson, The third caution of the race flew on lap 57 for conclusion of the first stage.

Stage 2 
The race restarted on lap 62, Seven-time and reigning series champion Jimmie Johnson wound up in crowded traffic while trying to pit on lap 67. Johnson was bumped by Ty Dillon and that contact pushed Johnson into Danica Patrick. Johnson’s car received right rear fender damage.

Debris on the track brought out the fourth caution of the race on lap 82.

The race restarted on lap 88.

Ryan Blaney, racing to stay in the playoffs, edged Brad Keselowski to win the race’s second stage. Following were Clint Bowyer, Chase Elliott and Kurt Busch, The fifth caution of the race flew on lap 112 for conclusion of the second stage.

Final stage 

The race restarted on lap 116 and it remained green for 37 laps. The last 40 laps of the race were marred by a series of crashes that significantly thinned out the size of the field. On Lap 153, an apparent blown tire sent Trevor Bayne's car sliding into the outside wall near turn 3, producing the race’s sixth caution. Dale Earnhardt Jr. bumped into Daniel Suárez in traffic near the accident, but neither car suffered major damage.

The race restarted on lap 156 and the seventh caution of the race flew two laps later for a multi-car wreck at the back of the field in turn 1.  A. J. Allmendinger, Aric Almirola, Clint Bowyer and Cole Whitt were involved. Bowyer, angry at his team because of a slow pit stop that dropped him deep into the field, where he was swept into the accident, got out of his car on pit road and climbed on his pit wagon to complain to the team.

The race restarted on lap 160 and the eighth caution flew six laps later for a three-car wreck in the backstretch involving D. J. Kennington and Joey Gase.

The race restarted on lap 171 and the ninth caution flew two laps later as “The Big One” ensued in turn 3. It started when Martin Truex Jr. tried to go four wide and clipped David Ragan, causing Ragan to spin into Kurt Busch and Jimmie Johnson and collect an additional 16 cars including Kyle Busch, Kevin Harvick, Matt Kenseth, Austin Dillon, Landon Cassill, Dale Earnhardt Jr., Matt DiBenedetto, Danica Patrick, Ty Dillon, Ricky Stenhouse Jr., Brendan Gaughan, and Michael McDowell. A lengthy red flag was brought out to allow for cleanup.

The race restarted on lap 176. The tenth caution of the race flew on lap 177 for a smaller Big One in turn 3, as Joey Logano and Ryan Blaney started a multi-car crash that also collected Brendan Gaughan, Kevin Harvick and Trevor Bayne. Earnhardt and Brad Keselowski barely avoided the crash, which resulted in a second red flag for cleanup.

The race restarted on lap 181 and with only a handful of drivers left in the final laps to decide the race winner, more were eliminated with six laps to go when Chase Elliott and Daniel Suarez crashed while racing for the lead. Chris Buescher and Kyle Larson also were collected, which produced the eleventh caution of the race, and a third red flag. 

The race restarted on a three lap shootout. Keselowski passed Ryan Newman on the last lap in turn 3 to win the race, with Newman finishing second, Trevor Bayne finishing third, and Logano finishing fourth. Aric Almirola crashed after finishing fifth. Denny Hamlin, Earnhardt, Kasey Kahne, Gray Gaulding and David Ragan rounded out the top ten. Thanks to all of the crashes in the last 40 laps, only 14 cars were running at the finish (with all but Kenseth running on the lead lap), the lowest number of cars to finish at Talladega since 1986, and the most number of cautions at 11 since the spring 2004 race.

Post race 
"The right front was an inch and a half low, and I couldn't really push anybody or get some runs going, and nobody wanted to push me 'cause they could see I was struggling a little bit," Earnhardt said. "But we got lucky and missed a lot of wrecks there. It's real hard to get up there and keep that track position. These plate races get harder and harder to win, and congratulations to Brad."

Race results

Stage results

Stage 1
Laps: 55

Stage 2
Laps: 55

Final stage results

Stage 3
Laps: 78

Race statistics
 Lead changes: 16 among different drivers
 Cautions/Laps: 11 for 47
 Red flags: 3 for 35 minutes and 30 seconds
 Time of race: 3 hours, 47 minutes, 52 seconds
 Average speed:

Media

Television
NBC Sports covered the race on the television side. Rick Allen, Jeff Burton and Steve Letarte had the call in the booth for the race. Dave Burns, Marty Snider and Kelli Stavast reported from pit lane during the race.

Radio
MRN will cover the radio call for the race, which was simulcast on Sirius XM NASCAR Radio.

Standings after the race

Drivers' Championship standings

Manufacturers' Championship standings

Note: Only the first 16 positions are included for the driver standings.

References

Alabama 500
Alabama 500
NASCAR races at Talladega Superspeedway
Alabama 500